Zaraysky District is an administrative and municipal district (raion), one of the thirty-six in Moscow Oblast, Russia. It is located in the southeast of the oblast. Its administrative center is the town of Zaraysk. Population: 41,912 (2010 Census);  The population of Zaraysk accounts for 58.8% of the district's total population.

See also
 List of rural localities in Moscow Oblast

References

Notes

Sources

Districts of Moscow Oblast